Elizabeth Chambers (18 August 1933 - 26 May 2018) was an English actress best known for her portrayal of Domenica Van Meyer in the 1980s drama series Tenko. She has also appeared in The Bill, The Onedin Line, To Play the King and One Foot in the Grave.

External links 
 

1933 births
2018 deaths
British television actresses
People from Bracknell